TER Nouvelle-Aquitaine is the regional rail network serving the region of Nouvelle-Aquitaine, southwestern France. It is operated by the French national railway company SNCF. It was formed in 2017 from the previous TER networks TER Aquitaine, TER Limousin and TER Poitou-Charentes, after the respective regions were merged.

History
The merger of the three administrative regions of Aquitaine, Limousin and Poitou-Charentes took place on 16 January 2015, according to the changes to the law on the delimitation of regions. However, TER Nouvelle-Aquitaine, which brought together the former TER Aquitaine, TER Limousin and TER Poitou-Charentes networks, started in 2017.

In September 2018, the Nouvelle-Aquitaine region opposed the SNCF policy of running trains without a conductor as the former wanted conductors to be present on trains to avoid fraud and sell tickets.

Network
3,600 kilometres of rail lines cover the Nouvelle-Aquitaine region (including 249 kilometres of the LGV Sud Europe Atlantique which connects the LGV Atlantique to Bordeaux). There are 308 stations and stopping points. The region is criss-crossed by TGV, Intercités, TER lines.

The towns served by TER trains are summarized in the table below. On several lines, trains are complemented by buses. As these services are taken up by the table in the next section, the table does not take them into account. The rail and bus network as of January 2021:

Rail

Bus

See also
Réseau Ferré de France
List of SNCF stations in Nouvelle-Aquitaine

References

External links

 
Rail transport in Nouvelle-Aquitaine